2013 Empress's Cup Final was the 35th final of the Empress's Cup competition. The final was played at Omiya Football Stadium in Saitama on December 23, 2013. INAC Kobe Leonessa won the championship.

Overview
Defending champion INAC Kobe Leonessa won their 4th title, by defeating Albirex Niigata on a penalty shoot-out. INAC Kobe Leonessa won the title for 4 years in a row.

Match details

See also
2013 Empress's Cup

References

Empress's Cup
2013 in Japanese women's football
Japanese Women's Cup Final 2013